Zedekiah ( Ṣiḏqîyāhū, "Yah is righteousness") was the High Priest of Solomon's Temple that succeeded Pediah. According to Josephus Zedekiah (Sudeas) was the son of Pediah (Phideas). He also appears in the High Priest list of the medieval chronicle Seder 'Olam Zuta.

Patrilineal ancestry
as per 1 Chronicles 27 (up to Jehoiada) and then Josephus

Abraham
Isaac
Jacob
Levi
Kohath
Amram
Aaron
Eleazar
Phinehas
Abishua
Bukki
Uzzi
Zerahiah
Meraioth
Amariah
Ahitub
Zadok
Achim
Eliud
Benaiah
Jehoiada
Pediah

Footnotes and references

8th-century BCE High Priests of Israel